Ivaylo Petrov may refer to:

 Ivailo Petrov (1923-2005), a Bulgarian writer
 Ivaylo Petrov (footballer born 1973), retired Bulgarian footballer who played for CSKA Sofia
 Ivaylo Petrov (footballer born 1991), Bulgarian footballer for Svetkavitsa